This is a list of airlines currently operating in Chad:

See also
List of airlines
List of defunct airlines of chad 
List of airports in Chad

Chad
Airlines
Airlines
Chad